Gábor Vayer (born 18 May 1977 in Paks) is a Hungarian football player who currently plays for Paksi SE.

External links
 zerozero.pt Profile
 90minut.pl Profile
 HLSZ

1977 births
Living people
People from Paks
Hungarian footballers
Hungary under-21 international footballers
Association football forwards
Paksi FC players
Győri ETO FC players
C.D. Santa Clara players
Digenis Akritas Morphou FC players
Fehérvár FC players
ŁKS Łódź players
Zalaegerszegi TE players
Nemzeti Bajnokság I players
Ekstraklasa players
Cypriot First Division players
Hungarian expatriate footballers
Expatriate footballers in Portugal
Expatriate footballers in Cyprus
Expatriate footballers in Israel
Expatriate footballers in Poland
Hungarian expatriate sportspeople in Portugal
Hungarian expatriate sportspeople in Cyprus
Hungarian expatriate sportspeople in Poland
Hungarian expatriate sportspeople in Israel
Sportspeople from Tolna County